Louis C. H. Finney (June 22, 1822  – May 21, 1884) was a nineteenth-century American politician and Confederate Lieutenant Colonel from Virginia.

Early life
Finney was born at Onancock in Accomack County, Virginia, and graduated from the Washington College, Pennsylvania. He studied law at Harvard University.

Career

As an adult, Finney lived in Accomack County, Virginia, and practiced law there. He was elected to the House of Delegates for the sessions 1848/49, 49/50, 50/51.

In 1850, Taylor was elected to the Virginia Constitutional Convention of 1850. He was one of two delegates elected from the Eastern Shore delegate district made up of his home district of Accomack County and Norhthampton County.

During the American Civil War, Finney served as a lieutenant colonel in the 39th Virginia Infantry, Confederate States Army.

Following Reconstruction, Finney was elected to the Senate of Virginia for the sessions of /1874, 1874/75, 1875/76 and 1876/77.

Death
Louis C. H. Finney died on May 21, 1884, in Accomack County, Virginia.

References

Bibliography

Harvard Law School alumni
Members of the Virginia House of Delegates
1822 births
1884 deaths
Virginia state senators
People from Accomack County, Virginia
People of Virginia in the American Civil War
Washington & Jefferson College alumni
19th-century American politicians